The 2020 Trans-Am Series season is the 52nd running of the Trans-Am Series. The National Championship began on March 1 and will run for twelve rounds. Within this championship, a Northern Cup and Southern Cup are also awarded consisting of the point totals from certain rounds for drivers who are not running the full season. A separate West Coast Championship will also be held with some rounds separate from the national series and some together.

Entry List

National Championship

West Coast Championship

Race Schedule and Results

National Championship 
A 12 round preliminary schedule was released on October 16, 2019 ahead of the final round of the season. Brainerd Raceway returned to the schedule and Daytona International Speedway was dropped due to scheduling conflicts. On March 17, 2020, the Road Atlanta round was forced to be postponed due to the COVID-19 pandemic. This was the start of a series of postponements and cancellations that lead to a revised schedule being announced on April 7, 2020. In this schedule, the Detroit round was dropped reducing the series to an 11 round championship. Unfortunately the planned restart of the series at Indianapolis Motor Speedway was also postponed with a new date for the track still to be determined and the series resuming at Mid-Ohio Sports Car Course instead. The rounds at Watkins Glen and Lime Rock Park were the final casualties of the outbreak with late cancellations leading to double headers at Virginia International Raceway and Road Atlanta.

† Race is held in combination with the Trans Am West Coast Championship

West Coast Championship 
A six round provisional schedule was released on October 31, 2019 ahead of the final round of the 2019 Trans-Am Championship. Sonoma Raceway gained a second date with the first kicking off the series and the second being moved to August. This was done at the expensive of the Auto Club Speedway roval which lost its place on the calendar. The final round at Circuit of the Americas was also moved to November. Due to the COVID-19 pandemic, however, the schedule was forced to change. Under the new calendar, the series started at Thunderhill Raceway Park and concluded with a double-header at Weathertech Raceway Laguna Seca.

† Race is held in combination with the Trans Am National Championship

Championship Standings

Points System  

Drivers may choose to declare for Northern or Southern Cup points, but these drivers may not run the full national season. Each Cup consists of the points from only some of the rounds.

Awards are also given to the highest ranked Master and Rookie drivers in each class. The Master classification is given to drivers over 60 years old while the Rookie classification is for drivers competing in their first full year. Some drivers may be eligible for both.

National Championship

TA

TA2

XGT

SGT

GT

West Coast Championship

TA

TA2

XGT

SGT

GT

Notes

External links 

 Official website

References 

Trans-Am Series
Trans-Am Series